Herbert Levine is an American luxury shoe label founded in 1948 by Herbert Levine and his wife Beth.

Label history

Background
The Herbert Levine label was named after former journalist Herbert. His wife, Beth, was the primary shoe designer of the label. She designed the footwear while Herbert handled the factory management, sales, and marketing.

The company
Herbert Levine, Inc. established its first factory on 31 West 31st Street in New York in January 1949.  The factory started with a production of 400 pairs of shoes a week; by 1954, it had 200 employees producing 5,000 pair of shoes a week. In 1975, Herbert Levine, Inc. was still making 900 pairs of shoes a day.

Herbert Levine shoes were distributed in numerous boutiques and high-end department stores across the United States and Canada, including Neiman Marcus, Saks Fifth Avenue, Joseph and Bonwit Teller. Herbert Levine shoes were also the first American shoes to be carried overseas by retailers such as Galeries Lafayette in Paris and Harrods in London.

In the 1950s, Herbert Levine advertisements were drawn by famous New York illustrator Saul Steinberg and were regularly published in The New Yorker and in Harper's Bazaar.

Closed in 1975, the label was revived in 2008 by Dennis Comeau and is today owned by Luvanis, an investment holding company.

The shoes

The Herbert Levine label gained media notoriety for outlandish designs: gilded wood platforms, slippers with newspaper, money, or candy-wrapper covered fabrics, Astroturf insoles, and shoes that were glued onto the wearer's nylon stockings.

Herbert Levine’s greatest influence however was re-introducing boots to women's fashion in the 1960s and the popularization of the shoe style known as mules.

Innovations

Fashion innovations introduced under the Herbert Levine label include:

 Fashion Boots into Haute Couture. Herbert Levine is widely credited as the first label to have introduced boots into Haute Couture. As early as 1953, Herbert Levine introduced a calf-length boot in white kidskin, which sold poorly. Most retailers saw boots as a separate category of footwear from shoes, to be worn for protection from bad weather or for work. By contrast, Herbert Levine argued that boots were shoes and could be an integral part of a woman's outfit. In 1957, Herbert Levine produced an entire collection built around fashion boots, and despite widespread skepticism on the part of other designers and manufacturers, calf-high, kitten-heeled fashion boots for women began to grow in popularity in the late 1950s and early 1960s.  With fashion boots, Herbert Levine started a trend which remains current four decades later.
 "Ballin' The Jack," also known as Spring-o-Lator mules, where an elastic strip allowed the wearer to keep the shoes securely on while wearing stockings despite the lack of any straps at the side or back of the shoes. Through much of the 1950s and 1960s a wide range of shoe designers used Herbert Levine's Spring-o-Lators in their shoe lines.
 Stocking boots (panty hose with heels attached), as well as boots made from materials like vinyl and acrylic.
 The "Kabuki" shoes, introduced in 1959, featured a close shoe set atop a curved wooden platform.
 "Cinderella" clear plastic shoes (1961), a style that inspired later designers including Charles Jourdan.

Designs

 On A Roll:  Created in 1952, the unusual rolled heel of this shoe is a highlight of the label.
 No-Shoe: Introduced in 1957, this unique design reduced footwear to its most essential element — the sole — which was treated as a decorative abstract shape. The  topless shoes were designed on a dare from Stanley Marcus. While topless shoes were in fact functional (they were secured to the foot with adhesive pads), the form has more importance as a theoretical exercise than as a significant fashion. The “No-Shoe” was the culmination of the brand’s exploration of the transparent shoe concept, spearheaded by the Cinderella shoe. The effect is of a bared, tiptoeing foot: nature supported by artifice.
 Aladdin's Lamp:  Emulating the shape of the magic oil lamp of Aladdin, this shoe was actually designed in 1959 by Beth Levine at the request of Diana Vreeland, fashion editor of Harper’s Bazaar, who wanted a shoe with a low heel, turned up at the toe, open yet closed, and with jewels on it.
 Barefoot in the Grass: Created in 1966, the “Barefoot in the Grass” sandals (made of an AstroTurf insole, a vinyl vamp and a green kid heel), are a witty use of contemporary and unexpected materials. When those sandals were worn, the grass was supposed to go with you.

 Paper Twist:  Appearing in a special feature of Harper’s Bazaar (July 1967), “Paper Twist” shoes were designed by Kathryn Stoll for Herbert Levine. The series was composed of brightly colored, doublefaced, laminated paper strips twisted into exquisite swirls and multicolour bands that flexed on composition soles.
 Race Car Shoe:  First designed for the wife of one of the drivers in the 1967’s Indianapolis 500, Herbert Levine produced many more versions over the years, including evening shoes with windshields and headlights. The shoe was featured in the 1967 movie Sole Art as well as in a full editorial spread in Harper’s Bazaar in March 1967. Prada also drew inspiration from classic American cars for its Spring 2012 shoe collection. The result, hot rod heels with headlights and chrome, bears a striking resemblance to  Levine’s race car shoe. 
 Scarf Shoe: Winning eternal fame thanks to a legendary picture from renowned photographer Guy Bourdin published in Harper’s Bazaar in 1968, the "Scarf Shoe" is an iconic model of the Herbert Levine line. Enclosing all the body in yards of silk chiffon, the "Scarf Shoe" flies upwards from a jewelled heel. Each "Scarf Shoe," a free-flowing stocking based on a solid sole, covered the leg with long streamers wrapping around the body.
 Lunar Boot:  A series of space-age boots were created to take advantage of the landing of Apollo 11 on the moon on July 20, 1969. The “Lunar Boot” was created out of reflective space-suit material and was a collaboration between Beth Levine and Sara Little Turnbull, an innovative product designer who was then collaborating with NASA.

Celebrity clients

First Ladies

The house of Herbert Levine served United States First Ladies Jackie Kennedy, Mamie Eisenhower, Lady Bird Johnson, and Patricia Nixon in the 1960s and early 1970s.

Herbert Levine made black velvet knee-high boots for Mamie Eisenhower as well as most of her pumps. For Jackie Kennedy, Herbert Levine custom-made a pair of thigh-high boots in burlap with a stacked heel, as well as many of the flats that became a signature element of the Jackie Kennedy style.

Stars and socialites
In addition to the popularity of the label with Presidents' wives, Herbert Levine shoes were also a favorite of Broadway stars, movie stars, and socialites. Some of the brand’s famous clients included Barbra Streisand, Marlene Dietrich, Marilyn Monroe, Dinah Shore, Janis Paige, Jane Fonda, Joanne Woodward, Joan Crawford, Lauren Bacall, Barbara Walters, Julie Andrews, Rita Hayworth, Peggy Lee, Cyd Charisse, Joan Collins, Cher, Linda Evans, Babe Paley, Rosemary Clooney, Betty Grable, Gladys Knight, Natalie Wood, Debbie Reynolds, Arlene Francis, Phyllis Diller, Helen Hayes, Chita Rivera, Joan Sutherland, Gwen Verdon, Liv Ullmann, Agnes de Mille, Carol Channing, Ali MacGraw, Barbara Hale, and Angela Lansbury.

Marilyn Monroe wore Herbert Levine shoes both in her private and public life.  Visiting Bement on August 9, 1955, Marilyn wore a pair of Herbert Levine's Spring-o-Lators, immortalized by many pictures, notably the series taken by photojournalist Eve Arnold.  In 1957, Marilyn purchased Herbert Levine red stilettos (size 7AA) from the Vogue shop in Montreal; those shoes are now part of the Bata Shoe Museum collection in Toronto.

Marlene Dietrich ordered many custom pairs of the so-called "Gigi Stocking Shoes" (in size 7 1/2B), and inspired the "Marlene Boot" line of the label, named for her famous legs.

Joan Crawford was a fan of Herbert Levine's Cinderella shoes.  She had those Vinylite shoes custom made by Herbert Levine because "she loved to see her feet."

Famous appearances

 Nancy Sinatra wore Herbert Levine boots for publicity shots and on stage during her period of fame for the song “These Boots Are Made for Walkin'.”
 Shirley MacLaine used Herbert Levine boots for dance numbers in Sweet Charity (1966) and Irma La Douce (1960), as did Eydie Gorme in the Broadway show Golden Rainbow (1968). Raquel Welch wore them in her television variety specials.
 Television character Della Street (portrayed by Barbara Hale) in the popular Perry Mason series often made Herbert Levine' Spring-o-Lators part of her trademark wardrobe.
 Elaine Stritch and all women wore Herbert Levines in Company (1970).
 Lady Bird Johnson, and her daughters, Lynda Bird and Lucy Baines, wore Herbert Levine shoes for Lyndon B. Johnson's 1965 inauguration.
 Patricia Nixon and her daughters, Tricia and Julie, wore Herbert Levine shoes for both Richard Nixon's 1969 and 1973 inauguration balls.
Mr. and Mrs. Levine were hired in 1965, along with famed couturier Emilio Pucci and designer Alexander Girard, to help overhaul a new look and style for Braniff International Airways. The campaign, developed by Jack Tinker and partner Mary Wells Lawrence, was dubbed The End Of The Plain Plane, and was a revolutionary airline overhaul that had never before been attempted. The campaign was considered one of the most successful advertising and image reworks in history.

Awards and Accolades

In 1954, Herbert and Beth Levine were awarded a Neiman Marcus Fashion Award for their shoe designs.

In 1967, a Coty Special Fashion Critics Award was awarded to Beth and Herbert Levine for “the look of the leg.” In 1973, Beth and Herbert Levine received a second Coty Award; to this day they remain the only shoe designers ever to win it twice.

Manolo Blahnik: "Beth Levine is without a doubt the most influential American shoe designer of the 20th century. She is to shoes what Eames is to furniture."

Christian Louboutin:  "Beth Levine was an influential free spirit.  There is nothing that I like more than seeing a creation coming from pure fun and pleasure, and this is always the case with Levine's refreshing work.  God bless her for that!"

Museums and Retrospectives

Herbert Levine in Museums

Herbert Levine shoes are in the collections of more than 20 museums around the world, including the Costume Institute at the Metropolitan Museum of Art (which owns around 140 pairs), the Fashion Institute of Technology in New York, the Bata Shoe Museum in Toronto, and the Kyoto Costume Institute in Japan.

Retrospectives on Beth and Herbert Levine

 "Herbert Levine," The Costume Institute at the Metropolitan Museum of Art, New York, 1976.
 "Herbert and Beth Levine: An American Pair," The Bata Shoe Museum, Toronto, 1999 and Headley-Whitney Museum, Lexington, Kentucky, 2000.
 "Beth Levine: From Farm to Fashion," Bellport-Brookhaven Historical Society, New York, 2007.
 "Beth Levine: The First Lady of Shoes," Dutch Leather and Shoe Museum, Netherlands, 2009, Bellevue Arts Museum, Seattle, 2010., and Long Island Museum, New York, 2015.

External links
 Herbert Levine Official Website

Notes

Shoe brands